Takamiya Station (高宮駅) is the name of two train stations in Japan:

 Takamiya Station (Fukuoka)
 Takamiya Station (Shiga)
 

es:Estación de Takamiya